The following is a timeline of the history of the city of Windhoek, Namibia.

Prior to 20th century

 1840s - Nama Orlam chief Jonker Afrikaner names settlement "Winterhoek"
 1880 - Nama-Herero conflict; settlement sacked.
 1890 - German military fort construction begins.
 1892 - Windhoek designated administrative seat of colonial German South West Africa.
 1898 - German-language Windhoeker Anzeiger newspaper begins publication.

20th century

1900s 
 1901 - Public library founded.
 1902 - Railway to coast begins operating.
 1907 - Landesmuseum founded.
 1909
 Turnhalle built.
  becomes mayor.

1910s 
 1910
 Church of Peace built.
 Luisen Apotheke (pharmacy) in business.
 1912
 Windhoek Railway Station opens.
 Reiterdenkmal erected (monument to Germans in the Herero and Namaqua Wars).
 1913 - Tintenpalast (colonial government building) constructed.
 1915 - 12 May: Town occupied by South African military during the First World War.
 1916 - German-language Allgemeine Zeitung (newspaper) begins publication.

1920s 
 1920
 Population: 716.
 Winterhoek renamed to Windhoek.
 1924 - Windhoek Synagogue built.
 1926 - Roman Catholic Apostolic Vicariate of Windhoek active.
 1927 - Die Suidwes-Afrikaner newspaper begins publication.
 1928 - Kaiser Street paved.
 1929 - begins operating.

1930s 
 1932 - Tintenpalast Gardens laid out.
 1937 - Bantu Welfare Hall built.

1940s 
 1946 - Population: 14,929.

1950s 
 1951 - Population: 20,490.
 1958 - Library/museum/archives building constructed.
 1959 - 10 December: Ethnic unrest.

1960s 
 1960 - Population: 36,049.
 1961 - Katutura township created.
 1964 - Black Africa S.C. (football club) formed.
 1965 - J. G. Strydom Airport opens.
 1968 - Racially segregated Main Location closes.

1970s 
 1975
 September: Turnhalle Constitutional Conference begins in Windhoek.
 Delta Secondary School Windhoek established.
 1977 - Republikein newspaper begins publication.

1980s 
 1981 - Population 96,057

1990s 
 1990
 21 March: Namibian Independence Day celebrated at Windhoek stadium.
 Kaiser Street renamed "Independence Avenue" (approximate date).
 Wernhil Park Mall in business.
 Sanlam Centre built.
 National Art Gallery of Namibia and Embassy of Germany established.
 1991 - Population: 147,056.
 1992
 University of Namibia established.
 New Era newspaper begins publication.
 Media Institute of Southern Africa headquartered in Windhoek.
 1994
 Polytechnic of Namibia founded.
 National Library of Namibia headquartered in Windhoek.
 1995
 May: Miss Universe 1995 beauty pageant held in city.
  built.
 Windhoek Country Club Resort in business.
 National  headquartered in city.

21st century

2000s 
 2000
 Matheus Shikongo becomes mayor.
 National Art Gallery of Namibia established.
 2001 - Population: 233,529.
 2002 - Heroes' Acre (Namibia) memorial unveiled near city.
 2005
 Renaming of Windhoek (as "Otjomuise") proposed.
 Sam Nujoma Stadium opens.
 2006 - City police department established.
 2007
 Namibian Sun newspaper begins publication.
 Windhoek Gymnasium Private School established.
 2008 - January: Airplane crash occurs at Eros Airport.

2010s 
 2010 - Old Mutual Namibia building constructed.
 2011
  construction begins in Kleine Kuppe.
 Population: 325,858.
 2014
  opens.
 Muesee Kazapua becomes mayor.

See also
 Windhoek history
 List of mayors of Windhoek
 , generally headquartered in Windhoek

References

This article incorporates information from the Afrikaans Wikipedia and German Wikipedia.

Bibliography

Published in the 20th century
 
 . via Google Books

Published in the 21st century

External links

  (Images, etc.)
  (Images, etc.)
  (Bibliography)
  (Bibliography)
  (Bibliography)
 

Windhoek
Windhoek
History of Namibia
Years in Namibia
Namibia-related lists
Windhoek